Up is a 1984 American short film directed by Mike Hoover and Tim Huntley. In 1985, it won an Oscar for Best Short Subject at the 57th Academy Awards. The film depicts a man who sets a hawk free, then tries to find it in the wild on his hang glider.

Cast
 Ed Cesar as Himself
 Erick McWayne as The Boy

References

External links

Up at Pyramid Media

1984 films
1984 short films
1984 drama films
1984 independent films
American independent films
American short films
Live Action Short Film Academy Award winners
1980s English-language films
1980s American films